The Rock is a New Zealand mainstream rock music radio station. The station targets 25–44 with a male skew, but has a significant female fan base. It plays rock music and showcases up-and-coming New Zealand bands.

The Rock has unpredictable features and countdowns, most notably The Rock 2000 (formerly The Rock 1500, 1000 & 500), an annual music countdown based entirely on songs voted for by their rock listeners.

Some of its broadcasts have been controversial, and the Broadcasting Standards Authority has upheld many complaints against it.

History

The Rock began broadcasting on 1 December 1991 in Hamilton as The Rock 93FM. The very first ever song to air on The Rock was Are You Ready? by AC/DC. The Rock was formed by Joe Dennehy GM, Grant Hislop PD, and Martin Dempster.The original line-up included Chris Clarke on breakfast (replaced by Mark Bunting after 2 months) and Roger Farrelly on Drive. Originally, The Rock 93FM was based in the basement of Radio New Zealand Broadcasting House in Hamilton, headquartered in the studios for ZHFM. The transmitter was originally located on the top of Waikato Hospital. In 1993 The Rock moved to new premises at 564 Victoria Street in Hamilton.

The station purchased a collection of FM frequencies from the Christian Broadcasting Association and transferred them to Nevada. Using the first of these frequencies a local version of The Rock was started in Taranaki in 1993, this station was originally broadcast on 100FM but after Nevada Resources Ltd and Energy Enterprises merged, the station moved to 95.6FM. A third The Rock station was started in the Bay of Plenty in 1996 with local programming. In 1997 The Rock created a regional network by replacing the Taranaki and Bay of Plenty stations with the Hamilton-based The Rock station and also networked into Rotorua.

Nationwide expansion

In 1998 The Rock began networking to other regions in the North Island. In 1999, The Rock moved to Auckland, and began broadcasting from there. Later that year, Energy Enterprises and Radio Otago merged to form RadioWorks; as a result, the station was networked into the South Island. In Christchurch, Radio Otago had already been operating their own rock station called C93FM and this station was networked to Dunedin and Invercargill, C93FM actually played a classic rock format similar to Radio Hauraki. RadioWorks replaced C93FM in Dunedin and Invercargill with The Rock and kept C93FM operating in Christchurch, but changed its format to Adult Contemporary and launched The Rock on a separate frequency. C93 no longer operates as the station failed to attract listeners after the format change. Christchurch C93FM listeners were gutted that their local Classic Rock station had a format change and had to give way to a Network station, the phones rung for weeks with upset listeners not liking the format change to Adult Contemporary. Today The Rock broadcasts in almost every market in New Zealand.

The only remaining original member of The Rock crew is Rog. Other DJs left, including Greenman, who went on his OE to the UK, Beachy (Christopher Beach) who moved into sales and Julie Moffett, who now works at RNZ.

Programmes

The Morning Rumble

The morning radio show is known as The Morning Rumble, the members of which are currently Roger Farrelly ("Rog", "Big Dog"), Bryce Casey (2020 Broadcaster of the Year), Andrew Mulligan ("Mulls") and Mel Abbot. Rog has been a co-host on the show since its inception. Simon Doull spent several years as a co-host, left and returned in 2015. In March 2011 Andrew Mulligan joined but left for Radio Sport a few years later and returned in 2017.

Bryce has attempted to break two world records during his tenure on the show, his most notable attempt being to break the record. He fell short by only a few hours, In June 2019 Bryce not only broke the world record for the longest time ten-pin bowling continuously, he also raised over $350,000 for the charity I am hope.

Hosts 
Roger, or Rog as he's known, joined the Morning Rumble in 1994. Prior to that he had worked the afternoon shift at The Rock. Rog serves as a leader of sorts for the Morning Rumble crew, and his ongoing banter and power struggles with Bryce provide a lot of the show's entertainment. Mel provides the female perspective on the show and reads the news, while Andrew Mulligan reads the sports news. The producers are Ryan Maguire and Mitch Farr.

Features 
On Fridays a section of the show was called 'Do Stuff To Jono Fridays'. This formed a large part of the entertainment value and was an early distinguishing feature of The Rock. Jono was made the victim of stunts such as 'The Human Slushy', 'The Pyramid of Fire', 'Human Coleslaw', 'Sleigh of Fire', 'The Skater Ramp of Doom', a full body wax, and giving Jono a tattoo on his bottom but not telling him that it was a love heart with the other DJs names.

In 2006 when Jono got his own slot with Robert on weekday afternoons, the show then became "Do Stuff To Jimmy". Stunts included putting electrodes on his nipples, and other assorted painful and humiliating acts. Jimmy is no longer working at The Rock, and there is currently no 'Do Stuff' segment. A one-off 'Final Ever Do Stuff To Jono' stunt was planned and executed in September 2009, during which Jono performed a 'Mega Stunt' - riding a BMX bike down a steep slope, through pyrotechnics and a pane of glass, and finally scaling a ramp to jump over a parked ute.

The Rock organised a 'win a wife' competition in early 2011. The winner would travel to Ukraine to meet a girl via the "Endless Love" dating agency. In response the Ukrainian group Femen organized a topless protest against this competition (in March 2011). A Femen activist advised: "Femen warns the 'lucky' winner of the New Zealand competition that he can expect an unhappy ending in Ukraine".

Rock Workdays

Mel Abbot takes over on-air from 10am – 1pm fronting The Rock Workdays show which also features a legends of rock hour between 12-1pm. Mel is followed by Caleb Greaves, who is also the technical producer of The Rock's drive show, from 1pm – 3pm.

Rock Drive
The Rock's drive show is hosted from 3pm – 7pm by Duncan Heyde ("Dunc"), who is also the executive producer of the show, with co-host Jay Reeve, technical producer Caleb Greaves and executive producer Tiegan Lilley ("Show Boss").

Rock Nights

Lee Weir ("Westie Lee") hosts Rock Nights.

The Rock 2000

The Rock 2000 is an annual countdown feature, counting down the 2000 biggest rock songs ever, as voted by listeners in an online poll. The chart order, including which bands and songs feature on the countdown, is determined by listeners via a voting system on the station's official website. The countdown runs on weekdays over a four-week period and is broadcast throughout New Zealand. In 2016, the list expanded by 50% as The Rock 1000+500, it was previously called The Rock 1000. Previous to that it was The Rock 500. From 2017 to 2019 it was known as The Rock 1500. Since 2020 it has been known as The Rock 2000.

Winners
2022 – Lynyrd Skynyrd - "Simple Man"
2021 – Rage Against the Machine - "Killing in the Name"
2020 – Foo Fighters - "Everlong"
2019 – Pearl Jam - "Black"
2018 – System of a Down - "Chop Suey"
2017 – Rage Against the Machine - "Killing in the Name"
2016 – Metallica - "Master of Puppets"
2015 – AC/DC - "Thunderstruck"
2014 – Tool - "Stinkfist"
2013 – Tool - "Sober"
2012 – Metallica - "One"
2011 – Metallica - "One"
2010 – Rage Against the Machine - "Killing in the Name"
2009 – Metallica - "One"
2008 – Metallica - "Enter Sandman"
2007 – AC/DC - "Back in Black"
2006 – Guns N' Roses - "November Rain"
2005 – Metallica - "Enter Sandman"
2004 – Metallica - "Enter Sandman"
2003 – Pearl Jam - "Daughter"
2002 – Metallica - "One"
2001 – Nirvana - "Smells Like Teen Spirit"

Frequencies

North Island frequencies

South Island frequencies

References

External links